MAKS or Maks may refer to:

People
Maksim (Maks), a Slavic given name
 Kees Maks (1876-1967) Dutch painter

Places
Maks, a settlement in northern Poland

Other uses
MAKS Air Show, an international airshow held near Moscow, Russia
MAKS (spacecraft), a canceled Russian air-launched orbiter project

See also

 Macks Creek, Missouri, USA;
 MAK (disambiguation)
 Mak (disambiguation)
 Max (disambiguation)
 Macx (disambiguation)
 Macs (disambiguation)